Martha J. Fleischman is an American art dealer and the former publisher of American Art. She is the president of the Kennedy Galleries. Fleischman serves as a board member of New York Public Radio and Democracy Now!. She is a trustee of the Archives of American Art. She is the former board member of the Art Dealers Association. Her father was Lawrence A. Fleischman.

References

American art dealers
Women art dealers